Neserigone is a genus of Asian dwarf spiders that was first described by K. Y. Eskov in 1992.

Species
 it contains three species:
Neserigone basarukini Eskov, 1992 (type) – Russia (Far East), Japan
Neserigone nigriterminorum (Oi, 1960) – Japan
Neserigone torquipalpis (Oi, 1960) – Japan

See also
 List of Linyphiidae species (I–P)

References

Araneomorphae genera
Linyphiidae
Spiders of Asia
Spiders of Russia